The Former Ploiești derby was the name given in football to any match between Romanian clubs Petrolul Ploiești and Astra Giurgiu. The two sides won a combined eleven domestic titles, and as of 2022 Petrolul competes in the Liga I, while Astra last played in the Liga III and is dissolved.

Background and history
Neither team played continuously in the city of Ploiești since inception; Astra was founded in 1921 in Ploiești as Clubul Sportiv Astra-Română, while Petrolul appeared three years later in the Romanian capital of Bucharest as Juventus, following a merger. The latter won its first league championship in the 1929–30 season, and in 1952 moved to Ploiești and changed its name to Flacăra Ploiești accordingly. It achieved three more national titles in 1957–58, 1958–59 and 1965–66.

The rivalry only started in 1998, when Astra promoted for the first time to the Liga I under the ownership of businessman Ioan Niculae. Their first meeting was a league fixture on 8 August 1998, which Petrolul won 2–1 at home. In July 2003, Astra Ploiești changed its name to FC Petrolul Ploiești, with Florin Bercea and Ioan Niculae becoming owners of the newly-formed entity and also with the home ground moving to Astra Stadium. According to the Romanian Football Federation, the new entity took over Petrolul's brand and record; Astra was refounded by Niculae in 2005 as CSM Ploiești after he renounced his stake in Petrolul.

In September 2012, Astra relocated to Giurgiu after 91 years in Prahova County, but even after the move the rivalry continued between the governances of the two clubs, with Ioan Niculae claiming at one point that Petrolul does not have any honours after the events of 2003–2005. While Astra did not attract large crowds in neither Ploiești nor Giurgiu, Petrolul fans continued to consider their derby with Rapid București the most important one. 

Astra became a prominent figure in Romanian football in the 2010s, as it won its first four major honours (one national title, one national cup and two supercups) and qualified twice for the UEFA Europa League group stages in Giurgiu. During the same time period, Petrolul only won one Cupa României in the 2012–13 season and went bankrupt in 2016. Astra additionally lost three cup finals in 2017, 2019 and 2021 on the Ilie Oană Stadium in Ploiești, the home ground of its former local opponent.

The two rivals met again in the same league during the 2021–22 Liga II season, but their ultimate fates were antithetical—Petrolul returned to the Liga I after ascending through the Romanian league system, while Astra relegated to the third division. On 19 October 2022, Astra withdrew from the championship and was subsequently dissolved.

Statistics

Head to head results

Honours

All matches

Games involving second teams

Players with both sides
One of the most notable footballers to play for both sides is 2017 Romanian Footballer of the Year winner Constantin Budescu—he has appeared in more than 380 matches in all competitions for Petrolul and Astra combined, as of February 2021.

 Geraldo Alves
 Mirel Bolboașă
 Damien Boudjemaa
 Constantin Budescu
 Nicolae Constantin
 Daniel Costescu
 Marian Cristescu
 Dragoș Gheorghe
 Romario Moise
 Mirko Ivanovski
 Adrian Pătulea
 Paul Papp
 Romário Pires
 Bogdan Rusu
 Takayuki Seto
 Pompiliu Stoica
 Gabriel Tamaș
 Filipe Teixeira
 Dinu Todoran
 Claudiu Tudor
 Alexandru Țigănașu
 Cristian Vlad

See also
Sports rivalry

References

External links
 Petrolul Ploiești official website
 Astra Giurgiu official website 

Football rivalries in Romania
Football in Romania
FC Petrolul Ploiești
FC Astra Giurgiu
1998 establishments in Romania